Dhakaiya Urdu   sometimes referred to as Sobbasi Language, Khosbasi Language and the Language of Dhaka Nawab Family  is a dialect of Urdu that is native to Old Dhaka and its immediate surrounding areas in Dhaka, Bangladesh. It is spoken by the city's Sobbas community, Khusbas community, Nawab Family, and other native communities. Sobbasi / Khosbasi is not Noun but  Adjective. The usage of the language is gradually declining due to negative perceptions following it being forced upon the people of erstwhile East Bengal. Dhakaiya Urdu is one of the two dialects of Urdu spoken in Bangladesh; the other one being the Urdu spoken by the Biharis and Stranded Pakistanis in Bangladesh.

Features
The dialect differs from Standard Urdu as it takes a number of loanwords from Eastern Bengali, which the dialect's source of origin is geographically surrounded by. The intonations, aspirations and tone of the language is also shifted closer to Eastern Bengali than Standard Urdu. It is described to be a fairly simpler language than Standard Urdu.

Writing system
Dhakaiya Urdu currently does not have a standardised writing system as it traditionally formed the diglossic vernacular, with standard Urdu forming the codified lect used for writing. Recently, Dhakaiya Urdu is being written in the Bengali script and also in Urdu Noori Nastaliq script by organisations "Dhakaiya Movement", "Dhakaiya Urdu Zaban" [Dhakaiya Urdu Language] and  "Dhakaiya Urdu Learning Centre” and "History of Urdu in Dhaka" aiming to preserve it.

History
The city of Jahangirnagar (now Dhaka) was Bengal Subah's capital in the mid-eighteenth century and Urdu-speaking merchants from North India started pouring in. Eventually residing in Dhaka, interactions and relationships with their Bengali counterparts led to the birth of a new Bengali-influenced dialect of Urdu. The descendants of these settlers came to be known as Khusbas (other names included Sukhbas and Subbas) which meant the happily settled. The Bais and Bara panchayets, used to converse in this language. Their Urdu language also influenced the dialect of the Bengali Muslims in Old Dhaka city which came to be known as the Dhakaiya Kutti and vice versa. However, Abdul Momin Chowdhury denied the contribution of Urdu as the source of this language. Because the language was not born yet.

The late 18th-century in Dhaka hosted the migration of Mirza Jan Tapish and other Urdu poets from Delhi migrating to the urban hub after an invitation from Shams ad-Daulah, the Naib Nazim of Dhaka. Poetry and literature in Standard Urdu grew popularity in Dhaka with the presence of organisations such as the Anjuman-i Taraqqi-i Urdu and the patronising of it by Dhaka's Nawabs, Sardars and Zamindars such as Khwaja Abdul Ghani and Mir Ashraf Ali. The 19th-century poet Mirza Ghalib of Agra was a close friend of Dhaka's poet Khwaja Haider Jan Shayek. The collaboration between Ghalib and Shayek was collected and compiled by Hakim Habibur Rahman, a later Urdu poet of Dhaka, in his book Inshaye Shayek. Habibur Rahman was a prominent Dhakaiya physician and litterateur whose most famous books include Asudegan-e-Dhaka and Dhaka Panchas Baras Pahle. He was the editor of Bengal's first Urdu magazine, Al-Mashriq in 1906. He later collaborated with Khwaja Adil in 1924 to found another monthly journal called Jadu. His works are celebrated for preserving Urdu, Persian and Arabic literature, compiling them into his Thulatha Ghusala.

Shortly after the Bengali Language Movement of 1952, Urdu culture decreased significantly with many Urdu-speaking families switching to speaking Bengali to avoid controversy. During the Bangladesh Liberation War of 1971, a number of Urdu-speaking families subsequently migrated to Pakistan. As a result, the use of Urdu has become very limited to a few families and a community south of the Dhaka railway line. Furthermore, the new nation of Bangladesh deemed their newly founded nation on Bengali culture, which would later alienate the other ethnolinguistic communities of the country.

Often described as a wealthy and closed-off community, speakers of the dialect honour the Dhakaiya Urdu poets of the past in privacy within their mushairas. Other modern examples of usage include the University of Dhaka's dwindling Urdu department as well as the Urdu sermons and Islamic lectures given in Dhaka.

Due to globalization in the culture and entertainment sector, many Hindi words have entered the language today.

Nazir Uddin, a Bangladeshi Canadian health & safety professional, and  Muhammad Shahabuddin Sabu, an Associate Professor of Zoology at Savar Government College, released a 59,380-word Bengali-Dhakaiya Sobbasi bilingual dictionary published by Taqiya Muhammad Publications in 2021. It was said that 15,304 Sobbasi words were of Bengali origin.  On 15 January, the book launch took place at Aziz Market in Shahbag.

Poets
These Dhakaiya poets wrote in Standard Urdu:
Mirza Jan Tapish (d. 1814)
Mahmud Azad
Ghaffar Akhtar
Agha Ahmad Ali (1839-1883)
Ubaidullah Al Ubaidi Suhrawardy (1834-1885)
Khwaja Ahsanullah (1846-1901)
Munshi Rahman Ali Tayesh (1823-1908)
Nawab Syed Muhammad Azad (1850-1916)
Khwaja Muhammad Afzal (1875-1940)
Hakim Habibur Rahman (1881-1947)
Reza Ali Wahshat (1881-1953)
Syed Sharfuddin Sharf Al Hussaini (1876-1960)

Media
The language flourished in the media during the 20th century cinema. Khurshid Alam and Sabina Yasmin sang a song, Matiya Hamar Naam, in this dialect for the Bangladeshi film Jibon Niye Jua which released in 1975 after the Independence of Bangladesh.

See also
Dhakaiya Kutti
Bengali Language Movement
"Dhakaiya Urdu Jaban and “Dhakaiya Movement” Channels both were created by Nazir Uddin 
"Dhakaiya Urdu Learning Center”
"History of Urdu in Dhaka"

Notes

Nazir Uddin, a Dhakaiya Originated Canadian OH&S professional pioneered various promotional, cultural and social activities and created many other social media with the objective to revive, promote and preserve this nearly extinct Dhakaiya Urdu Language. 

Pioneer Public Groups “Dhakaiya Sobbasi Jaban” renamed as "Dhakaiya Urdu Jaban" [Dhakaiya Urdu Language], “Dhakaiya Movement” and recently "Dhakaiya Urdu Learning Center” and "History of Urdu in Dhaka"  , consistently writing this dialect of Urdu [Dhakaiya-Urdu]  using both Bengali and Urdu scripts; with the objective to promote and preserve it. There are two video channels named "Dhakaiya Urdu Jaban" and “Dhakaiya Movement” are also available for practicing, promoting  and preserving  Dhakaiya-Urdu Language.

Khawja Javed Hasan, a British Citizen, Sales and Marketing professional and a descendent of the Dhaka Nawab Family, further boosted these promoting and preserving activities by conducting various seminars and symposiums in Dhaka Bangladesh. Under his leadership, he almost solitarily and courageously accomplishing & flourishing "Dhakaiya Urdu Language" remarkably well.

Rafiqul Islam Rafiq, a Bangladeshi Citizen and author of many books and articles mainly on Dhakaiya Urdu Language and Culture, has an incredible contribution to reviving "Dhakaiya-Urdu" through various activities and programs.

Barrister Sadia Arman, a Lawyer at the Supreme Court of Bangladesh, poet, author and a renowned person in the Dhakaiya Community;  and  Dr. Mohammad Golam Rabbani,  a reputed  Professor at the Department of Urdu, University of Dhaka and Chairman of the "Center for Literature & Research", have their various active roles in promoting and reviving Urdu / Dhakaiya Urdu in various occasions,  seminars and symposium etc.

Dr. Nusrat Fatema, Professor of Islamic History and Culture, at Dhaka University; earned popularity in the community for her research works on Dhakaiya Urdu in Traditional, Cultural and Evolutionary Aspects.

References

Further reading 

 Various Articles , videos etc. in Pioneer public groups "Dhakaiya Sobbasi Jaban" renamed as "Dhakaiya Urdu Jaban"       [means Dhakaiya Urdu Language], "Dhakaiya Movement" and "Dhakaiya Urdu Learning Center”.

Dhaka Shahore Urdu Sangskrti [ Urdu Culture in Dhaka City] ISBN 984-8319-38-7, published on February 2006;authored by  Rafiqul Islam Rafiq      
Legal Perspective to Practise One Own Language [ Dhakaiya- Urdu ] :  Barrister Sadia Arman, Adv. Supreme Court. Bangladesh 
Traditional Language of Dhaka: Dhakaiya - Urdu [ Research Paper] : Dr. Nusrat Fatema, Professor of Islamic History and Culture,  Dhaka University. 
Nearly Extinct Dhakaiya-Urdu Language, the Way Out Of It: Dr. Mohammad Golam Rabbani,  Professor Department of Urdu, Dhaka University   
History of Urdu Language : Asiful Islam, at Dhakaiya-Urdu Jaban  [ Dhakaiya-Urdu Language ].

 Bangal Mein Urdu : Wafa Rashedi, Hyderabad, Pakistan (1955)
 A History of Urdu Literature : TG Baily
 History of Urdu Literature : Rambabu Saxsina,  Lucknow.

Old Dhaka
History of Dhaka
Dialects of Urdu